Chris Harwood (born 1 October 1994) is an American-born cricketer. He made his first-class debut for Leeds/Bradford MCCU against Sussex on 5 April 2016.

References

External links

1994 births
Living people
Leeds/Bradford MCCU cricketers